Models Inc. is an American prime time soap opera that aired on Fox during the 1994–95 television season. A spin-off of Melrose Place, it is the third series in the Beverly Hills, 90210 franchise.

Models Inc. revolves around a Los Angeles modeling agency run by Hillary Michaels (Linda Gray), the mother of Melrose Place Amanda Woodward (Heather Locklear).

The series was created by Frank South and Charles Pratt Jr., and executive produced by Aaron Spelling, South, Pratt, and E. Duke Vincent. Models Inc. lasted only a single season and is the only series in the Beverly Hills, 90210 franchise not to receive a DVD release to date.

Cast

Main
 Linda Gray as Hillary Michaels: Owner and president of the upmarket Los Angeles modeling agency, Models Inc. Twice-divorced, she is the mother of Amanda Woodward from her first marriage, and David Michaels from her second marriage.

 Cameron Daddo as Brian Peterson: A jet-set photographer who is dating Teri before her death. Later, he becomes involved with Cynthia, but their relationship is plagued by her controlling ex-boyfriend, who eventually kidnaps, beats and rapes her. 
 Brian Gaskill as David Michaels (episodes 1–11): Hillary's son and vice president of the agency. He is in an on-again-off-again relationship with model Julie Dante, and also becomes involved with Sarah Owens. Midway through the series, David leaves Los Angeles for Paris to form his own modelling company.
 David Goldsmith as Eric Dearborn: A sleazy wannabe rock star and Linda's abusive boyfriend. They eventually break up but remain friends. When his career fails to get off the ground, he falls into prostitution. Later, Grayson recruits him to take down Adam, however he turns on her.
 Teresa Hill as Linda Holden: A model troubled by her past with drugs, alcohol and pornography. She is initially involved with Eric, who blackmails her with secrets from her past, and later is involved with millionaire Chris White.
 Heather Medway as Stephanie Smith (episodes 1–8): The receptionist at Models Inc., who has a crush on Brian. She is later revealed as the killer of Teri, and also tries to kill Sarah before being arrested for her crimes.
 Carrie-Anne Moss as Carrie Spencer: An aging model, and a veteran at Models Inc. since the age of 17. She is the older sister of Teri, whom she has a rivalry with, and is murdered in the pilot episode. When Grayson gains control of the agency, Carrie is forced out and becomes a prostitute to make ends meet. In the season finale, Carrie is kidnapped and held captive in Central America.
 Cassidy Rae as Sarah Owens: A young and naive model who is new to the fashion industry, originally from the Midwest. She moves into the beach house and becomes Julie's primary rival. During the series, she battles with alcohol and substance abuse, eventually checking herself into rehab. 
 Stephanie Romanov as Teri Spencer (episodes 1–8), and Monique Duran (from episode 8): Teri is Carrie's sister and one of the world's most famous supermodels – she is pushed off the balcony of a high rise building and killed in the pilot episode. Monique is a doppelgänger of Teri's, who enters a relationship with nightclub owner Adam Louder, and becomes a target of his vindictive ex-wife Grayson.
 Kylie Travis as Julie Dante: An ambitious Australian-born supermodel with a bad reputation. Her wild lifestyle and public drunkenness have made her a tabloid fixture. Julie endured a rough childhood with a neglectful, alcoholic, adoptive mother and a sexually abusive, alcoholic stepfather, which gave her a cynical attitude and a pessimistic view on life. She initially feuds with Sarah, but mellows as the series progresses. Later, she fights with Monique over Adam Louder, before admitting her feelings for Craig.

 Garcelle Beauvais as Cynthia Nichols (from episode 9): A beautiful, African-American model who suffers from bulimia and becomes involved with Brian. She endures a violent kidnapping and rape at the hands of her abusive ex-boyfriend, whom she shoots and kills.

Special guest stars

 James Wilder as Adam Louder (from episode 10): The owner of the nightclub Stage 99 and Grayson's ex-husband, who becomes romantically involved with Monique
 Don Michael Paul as Craig Bodi (from episode 13): A wealthy author posing as beach bum who writes an exposé called Skin Deep about the models of Models Inc., later falls in love with Julie
 Emma Samms as Grayson Louder (from episode 20): Adam's scheming, sociopathic, English ex-wife, who is arrives in Los Angeles after being presumed dead. Trying to drive a wedge between Monique and Adam, she buys half of Models Inc. from Hilary, and brings in new "models" from her former career as a madam. In the season finale, Grayson arranges Carrie's abduction and plots to kill Monique at her wedding to Adam. In the alternate ending, it is revealed that Grayson had been slain by the hitman she had hired to kill Monique. Like Heather Locklear in Melrose Place, she is credited as "special guest star" in the opening credits, alongside the main cast.

Recurring
 Robert Beltran as Louis Soto: A police lieutenant investigating Teri's murder
 William Katt as Paul Carson: Carrie's married lover and adopted father of her child
 Kurt Deutsch as Chris White: Linda's wealthy love interest
 John Haymes Newton as Mark Warriner: a priest who has fling with Sarah
 Lonnie Schuyler as Ben Singer: Adam's right-hand man

Production and development
Models Inc. is the third series in the Beverly Hills, 90210 franchise, and a direct spin-off of Melrose Place. In its second season (1993–94), Melrose Place was one of Fox's highest-rated shows, and had been called "arguably the hottest one-hour drama on television". In December 1993, Fox announced plans for a Melrose Place spin-off called Models Inc., set in a Los Angeles modeling agency. Spelling said, "[Fox] asked if we would do an eight-hour series. And we came up with Models." He initially explained that the series would center on Melrose Place character Jo Reynolds (Daphne Zuniga), and that two models would move into the titular apartment complex on Melrose Place before being transplanted into the new series. Entertainment Weekly also reported that the estranged mother of Amanda Woodward (Heather Locklear) would be introduced on Melrose Place to  eventually lead Models Inc., and Locklear would not be headlining the new series as previously reported. Darren Star, the creator of both Beverly Hills, 90210 and Melrose Place, was not involved with Models Inc., which was created by Charles Pratt Jr. and Frank South, and executive produced by Aaron Spelling, Pratt, South, and E. Duke Vincent. Star said of the potential series, "It was one spin-off too many for me", though Spelling noted, "No one even thinks of Melrose as a spin-off anymore."

Farrah Fawcett was considered for the lead role in Models Inc., which ultimately went to Linda Gray. The rest of the cast were unknowns, and Spelling promised "a great deal of backbiting" on the new series. Gray's Hillary Michaels, Amanda's mother, was introduced in the last few episodes of Melrose Place second season to set up the new series.

After five months, producers were not satisfied with Models Inc. Nielsen ratings, and Pratt said, "I'm willing to try anything to keep this show on the air." A new direction in the writing dropped implausible storylines and promised "more romance, more modeling, and more personal traumas". Brian Gaskill was written off, and Emma Samms was brought in as villainess Grayson Louder. With Fox promoting her as the Heather Locklear of Models Inc., Samms said, "I will do the best I can, but I can't concern myself with whatever expectations there are."

Episodes

Alternate ending
The last episode of Models Inc. ended with a cliffhanger that left multiple storylines unresolved. Later, the series aired in the European market with an alternate ending that featured Grayson's death and Hillary shuttering Models Inc. The series was subsequently aired on E! with the new ending.

Broadcast
Despite the presence of Gray and the mid-series introduction of Samms, the show's ratings remained poor, and it was canceled in 1995 when it placed 113th in the ratings with an average 7.1 rating.

Home media
Models Inc. is the only series in the Beverly Hills, 90210 franchise not to receive a DVD release to date.

Reception
Ken Tucker of Entertainment Weekly praised Kylie Travis, calling her the show's "major casting coup", but added that Models Inc. was "trying much too hard to match Melrose for self-consciously outrageous campiness." Tony Scott wrote in Variety, "No one does much acting, since not much is required, but the posturings are pretty. The couplings are so far uninviting, the script by creators South and Pratt off-the-rack material." David Hiltbrand of People described the show as "part underwear ad, part catfight, part Lifestyles of the Rich and Famous and part psycho ward" and noting that "so far it's also pretty stiff and strident, particularly in regard to the acting."

Notes

References

External links

1994 American television series debuts
1995 American television series endings
1990s American drama television series
1990s television soap operas
American television soap operas
American primetime television soap operas
Beverly Hills, 90210 (franchise)
English-language television shows
Fox Broadcasting Company original programming
Modeling-themed television series
American television spin-offs
Television series by CBS Studios
Television series by Spelling Television
Television shows set in Los Angeles